Iron Springs is a South Mountain populated place on Toms Creek, in Adams County, Pennsylvania, United States, located west of Fairfield, that is near the location of the 1822 Maria Furnace.

References

Unincorporated communities in Adams County, Pennsylvania
Unincorporated communities in Pennsylvania